Dindica subrosea is a moth of the family Geometridae first described by William Warren in 1893. It is found in Sikkim, India.

References

Moths described in 1893
Pseudoterpnini